The 1995 World Archery Championships was the 38th edition of the event. It was held in Jakarta, Indonesia on 1–6 August 1995 and was organised by World Archery Federation (FITA).

The event marked the first championships where the compound discipline was contested. It also marked the last World Championships at which eventual women's recurve champion Natalia Valeeva represented Moldova (and previously Soviet Union) before switching allegiance to Italy, for whom she also triumphed at the 2007 World Championships.

Medals summary

Recurve

Compound

Medals table

References

External links
 World Archery website
 Complete results

World Championship
World Archery
A
World Archery Championships